The Muczne massacre of 16 August 1944 was the massacre of Polish civilians committed by the Ukrainian Insurgent Army (UIA) in village Muczne located in Bieszczady County in Poland.

Among the Poles were mainly refugees after the repression of the population in Volhynia and retreating in front of - 70 Poles were murdered. They were residents of nearby villages such as foresters, priests and children. Members of the UPA murdered Poles with axes, pitchforks and scythes. 

In place of the murder in 2010 the memorial and a wooden cross was erected.

References

Sources
 Grzegorz Motyka, "Tak było w Bieszczadach. Walki polsko-ukraińskie w Polsce 1943-1948", Warszawa 1998

1944 murders in Poland
Massacres in 1944
World War II massacres
Poland in World War II
World War II crimes in Poland
Massacres of Poles in Eastern Galicia
Mass murder in 1944
August 1944 events